Khiva (/, خىۋا; , ; alternative or historical names include Kheeva, Khorasam, Khoresm, Khwarezm, Khwarizm, Khwarazm, Chorezm,  and ) is a district-level city of approximately 93,000 people in Xorazm Region, Uzbekistan. According to archaeological data, the city was established around 1500 years ago. It is the former capital of Khwarezmia, the Khanate of Khiva, and the Khorezm People's Soviet Republic. Itchan Kala in Khiva was the first site in Uzbekistan to be inscribed in the World Heritage List (1991). The astronomer, historian and polymath, Al-Biruni (973–1048 CE) was born in either Khiva or the nearby city of Kath.

Etymology 

The origin of the name Khiva is unknown, but many contradictory stories have been told to explain it.

A traditional story attributes the name to one of the sons of the prophet Noah: "It is said that Shem, after the flood, he found himself wandering in the desert alone. Having fallen asleep, he dreamt of 300 burning torches. On waking up, he was pleased with this omen, he founded the city with outlines in the form of a ship mapped out according to the placement of the torches, about which he had dreamt. Then Shem dug the Kheyvak well, the water from which had a surprising taste. It is possible to see this well in Ichan-Kala (an internal town of Khiva City) even today."

Another proposal is that the name comes from the word Khwarezm, altered by borrowing into Turkic as Khivarezem, then shortened to Khiva.

Another possibility is that it came from the Śiva tribe of the Battle of the Ten Kings.

History 

In the early part of its history, the inhabitants of the area came from Iranian stock and spoke an Eastern Iranian language called Khwarezmian. Turks replaced the Iranian ruling-class in the 10th century A.D., and the region gradually turned into an area with a majority of Turkic speakers.

Russia annexed Khiva Khanate in the 19th century. The last Khan from the ruling dynasty was liquidated a century later, in 1919. Thus Khiva became the capital city of the new Soviet People's Republic of Khorezm. Khorezm oasis was converted into a part of modern Uzbekistan and Turkmenistan in 1924.

The earliest records of the city of Khiva appear in Muslim travel accounts from the 10th century, although archaeological evidence indicates habitation in the 6th century. By the early 17th century, Khiva had become the capital of the Khanate of Khiva, ruled by a branch of the  Astrakhans, a Genghisid dynasty.

In the 17th century Khiva began to develop as a slave market. During the first half of the 19th century, around 30000 Persians and an unknown number of Russians, were enslaved there before being sold. A large part of them were involved in the construction of buildings in the walled Ichan-Kala.

Campaigns

In the course of the Russian conquest of Central Asia, in 1873 the  Russian General Konstantin von Kaufman launched an attack on the city of Khiva, which fell on 28 May 1873. Although the Russian Empire now controlled the Khanate, it allowed Khiva to remain as a nominally quasi-independent protectorate.

Following the Bolshevik seizure of power in Russia after the October Revolution of 1917, a short-lived (1920-1925) Khorezm People's Soviet Republic formed out of the territory of the old Khanate of Khiva before its incorporation into the  USSR in 1925. The city of Khiva became part of the  Uzbek Soviet Socialist Republic.

Sights

Khiva is split into two parts. The outer town, called Dichan Kala, was formerly protected by a wall with 11 gates. The inner town, or Itchan Kala, is encircled by brick walls, whose foundations are believed to have been laid in the 10th century. Present-day crenellated walls date back to the late 17th century and attain the height of 10 meters.

Kalta Minor, the large blue tower in the central city square, was supposed to be a minaret. It was built in 1851 by Mohammed Amin Khan, but the Khan died and the succeeding Khan did not complete it.

The old town retains more than 50 historic monuments and 250 old houses, mostly dating from the 18th or the 19th centuries. Djuma Mosque, for instance, was established in the 10th century and rebuilt in 1788–89, although its celebrated hypostyle hall still retains 112 columns taken from ancient structures.

Khiva was a home to a number of madrassahs (educational establishments), one of which, Sherghazi Khan madrassah, still stands today. It was built in the 18th century by slaves and is one of the oldest buildings in Ichan-Kala, that is the center of present-day Khiva. Among the renowned students of the madrassah were the Uzbek poet Raunaq, the Qaraqalpaq poet Kasybayuly, the Turkmen poet and sufi Magtymguly.

Notable people from Khiva
The following people were born in the city.
 Tamara Abaeva (born 1927), historian.
 Sayid Abdullah (18731933), Khan of Khiva 19181920.
 Khudaibergen Devanov (18791940), photographer.
 Islam Khodja (18721913), Grand Vizier of the Khanate of Khiva.
 Israil Madrimov (born 1995), boxer.
 Bekjon Rakhmonov (18871929), politician.
 Palvanniyaz Khodja Yusupov (18611936), politician.
 Muhammad Rahim Khan II of Khiva, Khan of Khiva from 1864 to 1910

Sister Cities
The following list is Khiva's sister and twinned cities:
 Nishapur, Iran
 Yazd, Iran (2020)
 San Lorenzo del Escorial, Spain (2019)

See also

 Al-Khwarizmi
 Bukhara
 Slavery in Asia#Central Asia and the Caucasus
 Trolleybuses in Urgench

References

Publications

 Campaigning on the Oxus, and the Fall of Khiva, MacGahan, (London, 1874).
 A Ride to Khiva: Travels and Adventures in Central Asia, Frederick Burnaby, (OUP, 1997; first published 1876).
 Russian Central Asia, Lansdell, (London, 1885).
 A travers l'Asie Centrale, Moser, (Paris, 1886).
 Russia against India, Colquhoun, (New York, 1900).
 Khiva, in Russian, S. Goulichambaroff, (Askhabad, 1913).
 A Carpet Ride to Khiva, C. A. Alexander, (London, 2010).

External links

 Slave trade in Khiva
 Beyond the Bazaars: Geographies of the slave trade in Central Asia

 
Archaeological sites in Uzbekistan
Populated places in Xorazm Region
Cities in Uzbekistan
Populated places along the Silk Road
Khanate of Khiva